George Robertson (8 September 1915 – 24 January 2006) was a Scottish footballer, who played as a right half for Irvine Meadow, Kilmarnock and Scotland. He played in the 1938 Scottish Cup Final which Kilmarnock lost to East Fife after a replay.

References

Sources

External links

London Hearts profile (Scotland)
London Hearts profile (Scottish League)

1915 births
2006 deaths
Scottish footballers
Association football wing halves
Footballers from Kilmarnock
Scotland international footballers
Scottish Junior Football Association players
Dalry Thistle F.C. players
Irvine Meadow XI F.C. players
Kilmarnock F.C. players
Scottish Football League players
Scottish Football League representative players